WGN may refer to:

"World's Greatest Newspaper", former slogan of the Chicago Tribune and the namesake for the WGN broadcasting outlets in Chicago, Illinois.
WGN (AM), a radio station (720 AM) licensed to Chicago, Illinois, United States
 WGN-TV, a television station (channel 9.1 virtual/19 digital) licensed to Chicago, Illinois, United States
 WGN America, the former name of NewsNation, a cable television network based in Chicago, Illinois, United States
 WFMT, a radio station (98.7 FM) licensed to Chicago, Illinois, United States, which operates on the frequency formerly belonging to the Tribune-owned FM station that used the call sign WGNB from 1945 until 1953
 Shaoyang Wugang Airport, IATA code WGN
 White Gaussian noise
 Additive white Gaussian noise
 The ICAO airline designator for Western Global Airlines
 WGN, Journal of the International Meteor Organization
 WorldGaming Network